East Thrace or Eastern Thrace ( or simply Trakya; , Anatoliki Thraki; , Iztochna Trakiya), also known as Turkish Thrace or European Turkey, is the part of Turkey that is geographically a part of Southeast Europe. It accounts for 3.4% of Turkey's land area but comprises 15% of its total population. The largest city of the region is Istanbul, which straddles the Bosporus between Europe and Asia. East Thrace is of historic importance as it is next to a major sea trade corridor and constitutes what remains of the once-vast Ottoman region of Rumelia. It is currently also of specific geostrategic importance because the sea corridor, which includes two narrow straits, provides access to the Mediterranean Sea from the Black Sea for the navies of five countries: Russia, Ukraine, Romania, Bulgaria, and Georgia. The region also serves as a future connector of existing Turkish, Bulgarian, and Greek high-speed rail networks.

Population 
In East Thrace, the majority of the Muslim Populations are descendants of the Muhacir, such as Balkan Turks, Bulgarian Turks in Turkey, Amuca tribe, Albanians in Turkey, Bosniaks in Turkey, Gajal, Pomaks in Turkey, Megleno-Romanians, Vallahades, Crimean Tatars in Turkey, Circassians in Turkey, and Romani people in Turkey live there.

Definition 
East Thrace sometimes refers to the eastern part of the historical region of Thrace. It is also used for the parts of Thrace that is inside Turkey. The area includes all the territories of the Turkish provinces of Edirne, Tekirdağ and Kırklareli, as well as those territories on the European continent of the provinces of Çanakkale and Istanbul. The land borders of East Thrace were defined by the Treaty of Constantinople (1913) and the Bulgarian-Ottoman convention (1915), and were reaffirmed by the Treaty of Lausanne. The term "European Turkey" is usually opposed by the Turkish People since the country is seen European as a whole usually, the ongoing debate shows that a large majority of people in Turkey classify the country as European, while almost none describes is as Western Asian.

Climate 
East Thrace has a hybrid mediterranean climate/humid subtropical climate on the Aegean Sea coast and the Marmara Sea coast, and an oceanic climate on the Black Sea coast. Summers are warm to hot, humid and moderately dry whereas winters are cold and wet and sometimes snowy. The coastal climate keeps the temperatures relatively mild.

Geography 
East Thrace has an area of 23,764 km2 (3.4 percent of Turkey's land area), slightly smaller than Sardinia; the population density is around 430 people/km2, compared to about 80 people/km2 for Asiatic Turkey, which is also called Anatolia or Asia Minor. However, densities are skewed by the metropolis of Istanbul. The two continents are separated by the Dardanelles, the Bosphorus (collectively known as the Turkish Straits) and the Sea of Marmara, a route of about 361 km. The southernmost part of Eastern Thrace is called the Gallipoli peninsula. European Turkey is bordered on the west by Greece for 212 km and on the north by Bulgaria for 269 km, with the Aegean Sea to the south-west and the Black Sea to the north-east.

** Disclaimer: Sources may modify and/or release updated data, this will not be automatically reflected in these tables, additionally the refugee crisis' vast floating migrants have seriously complicated data collection, especially since 2013. Estimates and Census use different methodology and are not directly comparable. Source: Citypopulation.de mirroring data from: State Institute of Statistics, Republic of Turkey (web).

History 

East Thrace was the setting for several important events in history and legend, including:

 In 1000 BCE, Thracian tribes found the settlements of Lygos and Semistra; Plinius mentions the founding of Semistra in his histories and traces of Lygos remain near Seraglio Point.
 The Greek myth of Hero and Leander takes place in the ancient city of Sestus.
 Aeneas founded the city of Aenus while trying to find new lands during his mythological travels.
 After the death of Alexander the Great, in the period called the Diadochi, Alexander's general Lysimachus (360-281 BC) became king of Thrace and established his capital in Lysimachia.
 The Battle of Adrianople in 378 was an important turning point in the decline of the Roman Empire. 
 Çimpe Castle was the first European territory held by the Ottoman Empire, dating back to 1352.
 Edirne was the second capital of the Ottoman Empire after Bursa.
 The Gallipoli Campaign, one of the most important campaigns of the First World War, was fought on the Gallipoli peninsula.

The mass killings and displacement of Thracian Bulgarians in 1913 and the 1923 population exchange between Greece and Turkey ethnically cleansed the Orthodox populations. Jews were ethnically cleansed as a result of 1934 Thrace pogroms. 

During the Russo-Turkish War (1877–1878) and the Balkan Wars (1912–1913), Muslim Muhacir of various ethnic groups from the former Ottoman territories in the Balkans, were forced to flee toward Eastern Thrace through expulsions, violence and massacres, followed by further emigration caused by the 1923-24 Population exchange between Greece and Turkey.

Prior to that the distribution of ethnoreligious groups in the local sanjaks was as follows:

The Muslim millet was recorded as Turkish, while the church members of the Ecumenical Patriarchate were recorded as Greek.

In the past century, modern East Thrace was the main component of the territory of the Adrianople Vilayet, which excluded the Constantinople Vilayet, but included West Thrace and parts of the Rhodopes and Sakar. A publication from December 21, 1912 in the Belgian magazine Ons Volk Ontwaakt (‘Our Nation Awakes’) estimated 1,006,500 inhabitants in the vilayet:

21st century East Thrace constitutes what remains of Turkish Rumelia, which once stretched as far north as Hungary and as far west as Bosnia. Rumelia was lost piecemeal from 1699 onwards, until in 1912 the bulk of it was lost in the First Balkan War. Some small regains were made during the Second Balkan War. The current borders were set forth in the Treaty of Constantinople (1913) and the Bulgarian-Ottoman convention (1915), and were reaffirmed in the Treaty of Lausanne.

Attractions and Festivals 
Some tourist attractions are the Edirne Museum, Complex of Sultan Bayezid II Health Museum, Treaty of Lausanne Monument and Museum, Kırklareli Museum, and the Edirne Palace. There are several historical religious buildings, such as the Selimiye Mosque, Üç Şerefeli Mosque, Old Mosque, Muradiye Mosque, and the Grand Synagogue of Edirne. There are also historical bridges, such as the Fatih Bridge, Meriç Bridge, and Uzunköprü Bridge.

Natural attractions include the Lake Gala National Park, İğneada Floodplain Forests National Park, Lake Saka Nature Reserve, and Dupnisa Cave.

Since 1360, the oil wrestling tournament Kırkpınar is held annually near Edirne; usually in late June. The Romani festival Kakava is held annually in Edirne and Kırklareli.

Gallery

Literature 

 The Yurta-Stroyno Archaeological Project. Studies on the Roman Rural Settlement in Thrace. P. Tušlová – B. Weissová – S. Bakardzhiev (eds.). Prague: Charles University, Faculty of Arts, 2022. ISBN 978-80-7671-068‑9 (print), ISBN 978-80-7671-069-6 (online: pdf)

See also 
 Geography of Turkey
 Northern Thrace
 Upper Thracian Plain
 Western Thrace

References 

 
Geography of Turkey
Bulgarian-speaking countries and territories
Greek-speaking countries and territories
Turkish-speaking countries and territories
Peninsulas of Turkey
Geography of Europe
Geography of the Middle East